Z Channel is one of the first pay cable stations in the United States.

Z Channel may also refer to:

 Z (TV channel), a French-language Canadian TV network sometimes called Z Channel (Fr. Canal Z)
 Z-channel (information theory), a communications channel used in coding theory and information theory
 Z Channel: A Magnificent Obsession, a 2004 documentary about the pay cable station

See also
 Channel Z (disambiguation)
 Z Music Television